In many written accounts, from medieval times until now, a large section of the mountain range that crosses the east region of the Metsovo area is referred to as Zygos. This name derives from the name Zygos or ʤugu in the local Vlach dialect, which the people of Metsovo used to refer to a certain saddle (notch) of the same mountain ridge that served as a mountain pass. For centuries it was the highest point of the main travel route between Epirus and Thessaly. The timeless importance of this section of the ridge to land transportation in the past, the difficulties faced by travelers in the wintertime as well its pristine beauty made it the object of multiple and extensive references from antiquity until recent years. The wanderer Leake considers Zygos as the most noteworthy mountain in Greece and the location of the springs of its largest rivers. The painter Edward Lear says that Zygos is the "parent" of the greatest rivers in Greece, it regulates travel between Epirus and Thessaly and it is equally famous for its interconnections, its geographical and political position, and its picturesque scenery.

Sources

Socrates Scholasticus, Ekklisiastiki Istoria [Historia Ecllesiastica], Migne PG, Vol. 67, verses 710, 756.
D. Sofianos, "Acta Stagorum, Ta yper tis Thessalikis episkopis Stagon palaia vyzantina eggrafa (ton eton 1163, 1336 kai 1393)" [Acta Stagorum: the Byzantine documents for the Thessalic diocese of Stagai [from the years 1163, 1336 and 1393)], Trikalina 13 (1993), pp. 27–54.
W. M. Leake, Travels in northern Greece, Α.Μ.Ηakkert-Publisher, (photographic reprint Amsterdam 1967), Vol. 1, pp. 411–416, Vol. 4, p. 261.
F.C.H.L. Pouqueville, Voyage de la Grèce, Vol 4, shez firmin Didot Père et Fils, Paris 1826, pp. 320–323.
Ε. Lear, Journals of a landscape painter in Albania, R .Bentley, London, 1843, p. 382.
Α. Philippson, Thessalien und Epirus, Reisenund foschungen im nördlichen Griechenland, W.H. Kühl, Berlin 1897, pp. 172–190.
K. Stergiopoulos, Ai diodoi tis Pindou kata tous proistorikous chronous [The Passages of Pindos in the prehistoric age], in the volume dedicated to K. Amanton, Athens 1940, p. 290.
N. Kosmas, "Oi diodoi tis Pindou" [The passages of Pindos], Epirotiki Estia 4 (1955), pp. 14–20.
D. Evaggelidis, "Apo tin palia istoria tis Epirou" [From the old history of Epirus], Epirotiki Zoi 3(1946), pp. 15–18.
R. Curzon, "Taksidi stin Epiro to 1834" [Trip to Epirus in 1834], transl. I.E.A., Epirotiki Estia 91 (1959), pp. 876–881.

Mountain ranges of Greece
Landforms of Ioannina (regional unit)
Landforms of Epirus (region)